August Wriedt was a weather ship built in 1929 as the fishing vessel Dolly Kühling. She was renamed August Wriedt in 1935. She served as HMS Maria, a wreck dispersal vessel, until 1950 and was scrapped in 1951.

Description
She was powered by a triple expansion steam engine driving a single screw propeller, which gave her a speed . The engine, rated at 88nhp, was built by the Ottensener Maschinenbau GmbH, Altona, Hamburg.

History
Dolly Kühling was built as yard number 277 in 1929 by the Schiffswerft von Henry Koch AG, Lübeck as a fishing trawler for the Hochseefisherei J. Wieting AG. She was launched on 6 March 1929 and was completed later that month. Her port of registry was Bremerhaven and the Code Letters QVMR were allocated. In 1932, she was sold to the Hansa-Hochseefischerei. Her port of registry was changed to Cuxhaven. In 1934, she was sold to the Nordsee Deutsche Hochseefisherei, Cuxhaven. Her Code Letters were changed to DHFI. She was renamed August Wriedt on 21 May 1935. On 22 February 1937, a crewman was killed in an accident at Aberdeen, United Kingdom when his clothing became caught in a winch.

In 1940, August Wriedt was requisitioned by the Kriegsmarine. She served as the weather ship WBS 8 August Wriedt. On 29 May 1941, August Wriedt was intercepted and captured in the Atlantic Ocean by  shortly after leaving Bordeaux, Gironde, France. a prize crew took her to St. John's, Newfoundland. She was commissioned into the Royal Navy as HMS Maria in 1942, serving as a wreck dispersal vessel. HMS Maria was sold out of service in 1950. She was scrapped in June 1951.

External links
Photo of trawler August Wriedt
Photo of HMS Maria

References

1929 ships
Ships built in Lübeck
Fishing vessels of Germany
World War II auxiliary ships of Germany
Weather ships
Maritime incidents in May 1941
Naval ships of Germany captured by the United Kingdom during World War II
World War II auxiliary ships of the United Kingdom